Windfall is a 1974 country rock album by Rick Nelson and the Stone Canyon Band.

The album peaked at #190 on the Billboard charts.

Critical reception
Rolling Stone gave the album a mostly positive review, praising two of Nelson's contributions, "Lifestream" and "Someone to Love."

Track listing
 "Legacy" (Dennis Larden) – 3:24
 "Someone to Love" (Rick Nelson) – 3:58
 "How Many Times" (Jay DeWitt White) – 4:42
 "Evil Woman Child" (Larden) – 3:45
 "Don't Leave Me Here" (Larden) – 2:44
 "Wild Nights in Tulsa" (Don Burns, Riley Wildflower) – 3:32
 "Lifestream" (Nelson) – 2:40
 "One Night Stand" (Larden) – 3:17
 "I Don't Want to Be Lonely Tonight" (Thomas Baker Knight) – 3:15
 "Windfall" (Nelson, Larden) – 3:00

Charts

Personnel
 Ricky Nelson - guitar, lead vocals
 Dennis Larden - lead guitar, backing vocals
 Tom Brumley - steel guitar
 Jay DeWitt White - bass guitar, backing vocals
 Ty Grimes - drums

Production
 Producer: Rick Nelson
 Recording engineer: Michael "Nemo" Shields
 Photography: John Longenecker
 Artistic design: Kristen Nelson

References

Ricky Nelson albums
1974 albums
MCA Records albums
Country rock albums